Oak Harbor High School is a public high school located in Oak Harbor, Ohio, United States. It is the only high school in the Benton-Carroll-Salem Schools district. Their athletic teams are known as the Rockets, and their school colors are red and green.

The student graduation rate in 2005-06 was 92.4 percent, down from 96.8 percent in 2004–05. In the 2006–2007 school year, the high school received an excellent rating from the Ohio Department of Education.

Athletics
Oak Harbor High School competes in the Sandusky Bay Conference in various sports.

Boys
Football
Golf
Soccer
Cross Country
Basketball
Wrestling
Swimming/Diving
Baseball
Track/Field
Tennis

Girls
Cross Country
Volleyball
Soccer
Golf
Basketball
Swimming/Diving
Softball
Track/Field
Tennis
Cheerleading

References

External links
 

High schools in Ottawa County, Ohio
Public high schools in Ohio
Public middle schools in Ohio